The Jija Bai class were seven mid-shore patrol vessels of the Indian Coast Guard, designed by Sumidagawa Shipyard Co. Ltd., Tokyo, and jointly built by Sumidagawa and Garden Reach Shipbuilders & Engineers, Kolkata between 1983 and 1985.

Design
The vessels were powered by two MTU 12V538 diesel engines driving two independent four-bladed propellers. The crew of the patrol vessel consisted of 7 officers and 27 enlisted sailors. The vessels were armed with a 40 mm 60 cal Bofors Mk 3 AA.

Ships of the class

See also

References

External links
https://web.archive.org/web/20130322073348/http://www.sumidagawa.co.jp/e/menu.htm
http://www.grse.nic.in
http://grosstonnage.com
http://www.marinebuzz.com/2012/01/31/indian-coast-guard-inshore-patrol-vessels-by-hindustan-shipyard-limited
https://web.archive.org/web/20150928121157/http://www.indiancoastguard.nic.in/Indiancoastguard/history/morehistory.html

Fast attack craft of the Indian Coast Guard
Patrol boat classes
Ships of the Indian Coast Guard